Dr. Charles Sprague Beightler (March 18, 1924 – March 27, 2011) was an American researcher and professor who won the Frederick W. Lanchester Prize in 1967 and was a Fulbright Lecturer in Germany.

Background
Beightler was born in 1924 in Cincinnati, the son of Donald Sprague Beightler, brother of Maj. Gen. Robert Beightler, and Elizabeth Bainer. The family moved to Chicago where he graduated from the Nicholas Senn High School. From there he enrolled with the United States Army's Specialized Training Program for Pre-Engineering. He served in World War II in France, Germany, and Austria in the 71st Infantry, 44th Division as a Radio Operator and Forward Observer, earning the Bronze Star in 1944.

Career
Upon returning home, he completed a Bachelor of Science in Mechanical Engineering at the University of Michigan in 1950 and worked as a Design Engineer with Aeronca Manufacturing Company between 1950-1951, before serving again during the Korean War. Going back to Ann Arbor, he earned a Master of Science in Mathematics in 1954. Following graduation, he began working with General Motors in a Research Engineering position. He then moved back to Chicago, being employed as an Operations Research Analyst with Caywood-Schiller Associates between 1956-1957 and then Director of Operations Research at Ernst & Ernst between 1957-1958. In 1961 he earned a PhD from Northwestern University.

Moving to Texas, he became an Assistant Professor in Mechanical Engineering at the University of Texas at Austin, eventually becoming a Professor by 1968 where he stayed until his death. As a member of the Operations Research Society of America, he was awarded the Frederick W. Lanchester Prize along with colleague Douglass J. Wilde for their work Foundations of Optimization. This compilation was praised for considerable unification of existing operations research theories and methods. In 1969 he received the "Book of the Year" award from the American Institute of Industrial Engineers.

During the academic year of 1971-1972, Beightler was a Fulbright Lecturer at the University of Freiburg in Germany. He also served as a research associate at Stanford University several times during the summer. He was a member of several associations, including The Institute of Management Sciences and the New York Academy of Sciences.

Besides Foundations of Optimization, he wrote several other books and papers, including "Applied Geometric Programming" in 1976 with Don T. Phillips.

Personal life
Beightler was married to Patricia Ann Thompson of South Bend, Indiana. She obtained a BA in Economics from Kalamazoo College and an MBA in Economics from the University of Chicago, where she studied under Milton Friedman. Together they had numerous children and grandchildren, including his son Dr. William John Beightler, a Clinical Research Professor at the University of Texas Medical Branch and formerly the husband of Dr. Eloise Garza, mother of New York producer Lauren Beightler.

He died in Austin in 2011 and is buried at the Central Texas State Veterans Cemetery.

References

1924 births
2011 deaths
American mechanical engineers
University of Michigan alumni
American expatriates in Germany
University of Texas at Austin faculty